Novokladovoye is a rural locality (a selo) in Starooskolsky District, Belgorod Oblast, Russia. The population was 452 as of 2010. There are 44 streets.

Geography 
Novokladovoye is located 17 km north of Stary Oskol (the district's administrative centre) by road. Nabokino is the nearest rural locality.

References 

Rural localities in Starooskolsky District